Deserticossus murinus is a moth in the family Cossidae. It is found in Kazakhstan and Kirghizistan. The habitat consists of semi-deserts and mountains at altitudes between 450 and 1,800 meters.

The length of the forewings is 16–25 mm for males and 18–25 mm for females. The forewings are dark grey. The hindwings are dark grey, but lighter at the base. Adults are on wing from June to August.

References

Natural History Museum Lepidoptera generic names catalog

Cossinae
Moths described in 1912
Moths of Asia